Varma Kosto Turunen (17 March 1913, Pielisjärvi – 16 March 1994) was a Finnish trade union activist and politician. He was a Member of the Parliament of Finland from 1939 to 1962, representing the Social Democratic Party of Finland (SDP).

References

1913 births
1994 deaths
People from Lieksa
People from Kuopio Province (Grand Duchy of Finland)
Social Democratic Party of Finland politicians
Members of the Parliament of Finland (1939–45)
Members of the Parliament of Finland (1945–48)
Members of the Parliament of Finland (1948–51)
Members of the Parliament of Finland (1951–54)
Members of the Parliament of Finland (1954–58)
Members of the Parliament of Finland (1958–62)
Finnish people of World War II